Lawrence is a city located in Essex County, Massachusetts, United States, on the Merrimack River. At the 2020 census, the city had a population of 89,143. Surrounding communities include Methuen to the north, Andover to the southwest, and North Andover to the east. Lawrence and Salem were the county seats of Essex County, until the Commonwealth abolished county government in 1999. Lawrence is part of the Merrimack Valley.

Manufacturing products of the city include electronic equipment, textiles, footwear, paper products, computers, and foodstuffs. Lawrence was the residence of poet Robert Frost for his early school years; his essays and poems were first published in the Lawrence High School newspaper. Lawrence is also the Birth Place of singer Robert Goulet who was born Haverhill St. in 1933.

History

Indigenous history 
Native Americans lived along the Merrimack River for thousands of years prior to European colonization of the Americas. Evidence of farming at Den Rock Park and arrowhead manufacturing on the site of where the Wood Mill now sits have been discovered.

At the time of contact in the early 1600s, the Pennacook or Pentucket had a presence north of the Merrimack, while Massachusett, Naumkeag, and Agawam controlled territory south of the river. The territory which would later be aggregated into the city of Lawrence was purchased from Pennacooks Sagahew and Passaquo in 1642 for the English settlement of Haverhill, and from Massachusett sachem Cutshamekin in 1646 as a post-hoc payment for the lands surrounding the English settlement of Andover (modern day North Andover center).

Founding and rise as a textile center

Europeans first settled the Haverhill area in 1640, colonists from Newbury following the Merrimack River in from the coast. The area that would become Lawrence was then part of Methuen and Andover. The first settlement within present-day city limits came in 1655 with the establishment of a blockhouse in Shawsheen Fields, now South Lawrence.

The future site of the city (formerly parts of Andover and Methuen), was purchased by a consortium of local industrialists. The Water Power Association members: Abbott Lawrence, Edmund Bartlett, Thomas Hopkinson of Lowell, John Nesmith and Daniel Saunders, had purchased control of Peter's Falls on the Merrimack River and hence controlled Bodwell's Falls the site of the present Great Stone Dam. The group allotted fifty thousand dollars to buy land along the river to develop. In 1844, the group petitioned the legislature to act as a corporation, known as the Essex Company, which incorporated on April 16, 1845. The first excavations for the Great Stone Dam to harness the Merrimack River's water power were done on August 1, 1845. The Essex Company would sell the water power to corporations such as the Arlington Mills, as well as organize construction of mills and build to suit. Until 1847, when the state legislature recognized the community as a town, it was called interchangeably the "New City", "Essex" or "Merrimac". The post office, built in 1846, used the designation "Merrimac". Incorporation as a city would come in 1853, and the name "Lawrence", merely chosen as a token of respect to Abbott Lawrence, who it cannot be verified ever saw the city named after him.

Canals were dug on both the north and the south banks to provide power to the factories that would soon be built on its banks as both mill owners and workers from across the city and the world flocked to the city in droves; many were Irish laborers who had experience with similar building work. The work was dangerous: injuries and even death were common.

Bread and Roses Strike of 1912

Working conditions in the mills were unsafe and in 1860 the Pemberton Mill collapsed, killing 145 workers. As immigrants flooded into the United States in the mid to late 19th century, the population of Lawrence abounded with skilled and unskilled workers from several countries. Protesting conditions, in 1912 they walked out of the mills. The action, sometimes celebrated as the Bread and Roses Strike, was one of the more important, widely reported, labor struggles in American history.

The Industrial Workers of the World (the "One Big Union", the "Wobblies") defied the common wisdom that a largely female and ethnically divided workforce could not be organized, and the strike held through two bitterly cold winter months. The young 15 year mill hand Fred Beal, who was drawn by the experience into a lifetime of labor organizing, recalls that, contrary to expectations, it was the most recent immigrant groups, "the Italians, Poles, Syrians [Lebanese] and Franco-Belgians", who "kept it alive.

After hundreds of the strikers' hungry children had been sent to sympathetic families in New York, New Jersey, and Vermont, and the U.S. Congress was induced to hold hearings, the mill owners decided to settle, giving workers in Lawrence and throughout New England raises of up to 20 percent. However, as a young Massachusetts Senator, John F. Kennedy was later to record, in the decades that followed the mill owners moved their capital and employment out of Lawrence and the region to the non-union South.

Post-War history
Lawrence was a great wool-processing center until that industry declined in the 1950s. The decline left Lawrence a struggling city.  The population of Lawrence declined from over 80,000 residents in 1950 (and a high of 94,270 in 1920) to approximately 64,000 residents in 1980, the low point of Lawrence's population. Much of the population relocated to nearby Methuen.

Urban redevelopment and renewal

Like other northeastern cities suffering from the effects of post-World War II industrial decline, Lawrence has often made efforts at revitalization, some of them controversial. For example, half of the enormous Wood Mill, powered by the Great Stone Dam and once the largest mills in the world, was knocked down in the 1950s. The Lawrence Redevelopment Authority and city officials utilized eminent domain for a perceived public benefit, via a top-down approach, to revitalize the city throughout the 1960s. Known first as urban redevelopment, and then urban renewal, Lawrence's local government's actions towards vulnerable immigrant and poor communities, contained an undercurrent of gentrification which lies beneath the goals to revitalize Lawrence. There was a clash of differing ideals and perceptions of blight, growth, and what constituted a desirable community. Ultimately the discussion left out those members of the community who would be directly impacted by urban redevelopment.

Under the guise of urban renewal, large tracts of downtown Lawrence were razed in the 1970s, and replaced with parking lots and a three-story parking garage connected to a new Intown Mall intended to compete with newly constructed suburban malls. The historic Theater Row along Broadway was also razed, destroying ornate movie palaces of the 1920s and 1930s that entertained mill workers through the Great Depression and the Second World War. The city's main post office, an ornate federalist style building at the corner of Broadway and Essex Street, was razed. Most of the structures were replaced with one-story, steel-frame structures with large parking lots, housing such establishments as fast food restaurants and chain drug stores, fundamentally changing the character of the center of Lawrence.

Lawrence also attempted to increase its employment base by attracting industries unwanted in other communities, such as waste treatment facilities and incinerators. From 1980 until 1998, private corporations operated two trash incinerators in Lawrence.  Activist residents successfully blocked the approval of a waste treatment center on the banks of the Merrimack River near the current site of Salvatore's Pizza on Merrimack Street.

Recently the focus of Lawrence's urban renewal has shifted to preservation rather than sprawl.

Events of the 1980s and 1990s

Immigrants from the Dominican Republic and migrants from Puerto Rico began arriving in Lawrence in significant numbers in the late 1960s, attracted by cheap housing and a history of tolerance toward immigrants. In 1984, tensions between remaining working class whites and increasing numbers of Hispanic youth flared into a riot, centered at the intersection of Haverhill Street and Oxford Street, where a number of buildings were destroyed by Molotov cocktails and over 300 people were arrested.

Lawrence saw further setbacks during the recession of the early 1990s as a wave of arson plagued the city. Over 200 buildings were set alight in an eighteen-month period in 1991–1992, many of them abandoned residences and industrial sites. The Malden Mills factory burned down on December 11, 1995. CEO Aaron Feuerstein decided to continue paying the salaries of all the now-unemployed workers while the factory was being rebuilt.

Recent trends

A sharp reduction in violent crime starting in 2004 and massive private investment in former mill buildings along the Merrimack River, including the remaining section of the historic Wood Mill—to be converted into commercial, residential and education uses – have lent encouragement to boosters of the city. One of the final remaining mills in the city is Malden Mills. Lawrence's downtown has seen a resurgence of business activity as Hispanic-owned businesses have opened along Essex Street, the historic shopping street of Lawrence that remained largely shuttered since the 1970s. In June 2007, the city approved the sale of the Intown Mall, largely abandoned since the early 1990s recession, to Northern Essex Community College for the development of a medical sciences center, the construction of which commenced in 2012 when the InTown Mall was finally removed. A large multi-structure fire in January 2008 destroyed many wooden structures just south of downtown. A poor financial situation that has worsened with the recent global recession and has led to multiple municipal layoffs had Lawrence contemplating receivership. On February 9, 2019, in recognition of the role the town has played in the labor movement, Senator Elizabeth Warren officially announced her candidacy for President of the United States in Lawrence.

Gas explosion 

On September 13, 2018, a series of gas explosions and fires broke out in as many as 40 homes in Lawrence, Andover, and North Andover. The disaster killed one resident and caused over 30,000 customers to evacuate their homes. A year after this first incident on September 27, 2019 there was another gas leak causing people to evacuate their homes again.

Timeline 

 1845
 Essex Company begins construction of dam and canal on Merrimack River.
 1846
 Essex Company Machine Shop built.
 Lawrence Street Church organized.
 Church of the Immaculate Conception established.
 1847
 Town of Lawrence incorporated from Methuen and Andover; named after businessman Abbott Lawrence.
 Lawrence Courier newspaper in publication.
 Bellevue Cemetery established.
 Franklin Library Association formed.
 First Baptist Church, First Free Baptist Church, First Unitarian Society, Church of the Good Shepherd, and First Methodist Episcopal Church established
 1848
 Boston & Maine Railroad depot established in South Lawrence.
 Lawrence Dam constructed across Merrimack River.
 Bay State woollen mills begin operating.
 St. Mary's Church organized.
 1849
 Manchester and Lawrence Railroad begins operating.
 Lawrence Sentinel newspaper begins publication.
 Central Church organized.
 Atlantic Cotton Mills starts in business.
 Lawrence Gas Company formed.
 Lawrence Brass Band formed.
 1850 – Population: 8,282.
 1851 – Grace Episcopal Church built.
 1853
 City of Lawrence incorporated as a municipal government.
 Charles S. Storrow becomes first city mayor.
 Lawrence Duck Company in business.
 Garden Street Methodist Episcopal Church organized as a congregation of the Methodist Episcopal Church.
 1854
 Additional part of Methuen annexed to the City of Lawrence.
 Pacific Mills starts operating bin business.
 Lawrence Paper Company incorporated.
 1855 – Pemberton Company in business.
 1860
 January – Pemberton Mill building collapse.
 Population according to decennial United States Census: 17,639.
 1861 – Massachusetts state militia called up by Governor in response to proclamation by 16th President Abraham Lincoln of a state of rebellion in the South following firing on Fort Sumter in Charleston harbor in South Carolina Confederate forces on April 12. Sixth Regiment earliest to respond with men from Lawrence, Lowell, Methuen, Stoneham, Boston. Heads south by train and is attacked by mobs of Southern sympathizers in Baltimore along Pratt Street while being pulled through on horse cars and later marching between the President Street Station of the Philadelphia, Wilmington and Baltimore Railroad on the east of the harbor to the Camden Street Station of the Baltimore and Ohio Railroad on way to the national capital at Washington, D.C. on Friday, April 19. Four soldiers killed and numerous wounded and among Baltimorean civilians as city police and officials attempt to escort troops. Considered the "First Bloodshed of the Civil War".
 Second Baptist Church established.
 1864 – Moseley Truss Bridge built.
 1865
 Eliot Congregational Church organized.
 Arlington Mills in business.
 Wright Manufacturing Co. formed.
 1867 – Lawrence Flyer and Spindle Works in business.
 1868
 Lawrence Daily Eagle newspaper begins publication.
 South Congregational Church and First Presbyterian Church established.
 1871
 Archibald Wheel Co. incorporated.
 Parker Street Methodist Episcopal Church and St. Anne's Church organized.
 1872 – Free Public Library established
 1873 – St. Laurence's Church dedicated.
 1876 – YMCA formed.
 1877
 Lawrence Bleachery established.
 Tower Hill Congregational Church organized.
 1878 – German Methodist Episcopal Church organized.
 1879
 Parts of Andover and North Andover annexed to Lawrence.
 German Presbyterian Church organized.
 Lawrence Bicycle Club formed.
 1880
 Globe Worsted Co. incorporated.
 Bodwell Street M.E. Church organized.
 1881
 Lawrence Line Company incorporated.
 Munroe Felt and Paper Company incorporated.
 Merrimac Paper Company incorporated.
 1882
 L'Institute Canadien Francais founded.
 Stanley Manufacturing Co. incorporated.
 1884 – Emmons Loom Harness Company organized.
 1887 – Lawrence Experiment Station established by the Massachusetts State Board of Health.
 1888
 Duck Bridge built.
 Board of Trade organized.
 1896 – High Service Water Tower built
 1890
 Public Library building constructed.
 Evening Tribune newspaper begins publication.
 July – Cyclone.
 1899 – 20,899 people employed in manufacturing in Lawrence.
 1905 – American Woolen Company builds Wood Mill.
 1910 – Everett Mill constructed.
 1911 – Lawrence bathhouse tragedy
 1912 – Famous nationally known 1912 Lawrence Textile Strike occurs with strife and casualties. Later known as the "Bread and Roses Strike".
 1918 - Central Bridge constructed.
 1919 - 30,319 people employed in manufacturing in Lawrence.
 1920 – Population: 94,270.
 1927 – Stadium opens.
 1931 – Boston & Maine Railroad depot active off Parker Street.
 1934
 Lawrence Municipal Airport established.
 Walter A. Griffin becomes mayor.
 1935 – Central Catholic High School opens.
 1943 – Climatic Research Laboratory for United States Army in operation.
 1966 – Daniel P. Kiley, Jr. becomes mayor.
 1972 – John J. Buckley becomes mayor.
 1975 – Paul Tsongas becomes Massachusetts's 5th congressional district representative.
 1978
 Immigrant City Archives at Lawrence History Center established for local history and culture with exhibitions.
 Lawrence P. LeFebre becomes mayor.
 1985 – Greater Lawrence Habitat for Humanity organized.
 1986 – Kevin J. Sullivan becomes mayor.
 1991 – Northern Essex Community College active in Lawrence.
 1995 – Malden Mills fire.
 2001 – Michael J. Sullivan becomes mayor.
 2004 – Notre Dame Cristo Rey High School opens.
 First observance of Civil War Weekend at central Compeigne Common in October remembering local casualties then nationally famous and considered first "martyrs for the Union" of the noted Sixth Massachusetts volunteer state militia regiment in infamous Baltimore riot of 1861 (also known as the "Pratt Street Riots") as the "First Bloodshed of the Civil War" on April 19, 1861. Various military reenactment units and heritage groups including from the Baltimore Civil War Museum at the historic President Street Station participate with memorial ceremonies at Soldiers Monument in Common and gravesites at historic Bellevue Cemetery, sponsored by the Lawrence Civil War Memorial Guard.
 2005 – Lawrence (MBTA station) reopens for the Boston commuter train, subway and transit system.
 2007 – Niki Tsongas becomes Massachusetts's 5th congressional district representative.
 2010
 Population: 76,377.
 William Lantigua becomes mayor of Lawrence, first of Hispanic ancestry.
 2012
 School Superintendent convicted of fraud and embezzlement.
 Centennial observed of infamous 1912 Lawrence Textile Strike, later known as "Bread and Roses" labor strife.

History of Lawrence immigrant communities
Lawrence has been aptly nicknamed the "Immigrant City". It has been home to numerous different immigrant communities, most of whom arrived during the great wave of European immigration to America that ended in the 1920s.

Immigrant communities, 1845–1920
Lawrence became home to large groups of immigrants from Europe, beginning with the Irish in 1845, Germans after the social upheaval in Germany in 1848, Swedes fleeing an overcrowded Sweden, and French Canadians seeking to escape hard northern farm life from the 1850s onward. A second wave began arriving after 1900, as part of the great mass of Italian and Eastern European immigrants, including Jews from Russia, Poland, Lithuania and neighboring regions. Immigration to the United States was severely curtailed in the 1920s with the Immigration Act of 1924, when foreign-born immigration to Lawrence virtually ceased for over 40 years.

In 1890, the foreign-born population of 28,577 was divided as follows, with the significant remainder of the population being children of foreign born residents: 7,058 Irish; 6,999 French Canadians; 5,131 English; 2,465 German; 1,683 English Canadian. In 1920, toward the end of the first wave of immigration, most ethnic groups had numerous social clubs in the city.  The Portuguese had 2; the English had 2; the Jews had 3; the Armenians, 5; the Lebanese and Syrians, 6; the Irish, 8; the Polish, 9; the French Canadians and Belgian-French, 14; the Lithuanians, 18; the Italians, 32; and the Germans, 47.  However, the center of social life, even more than clubs or fraternal organizations, was churches.  Lawrence is dotted with churches, many now closed, torn down or converted into other uses. These churches signify, more than any other artifacts, the immigrant communities that once lived within walking distance of each church.

Germans
The first sizable German community arrived following the revolutions of 1848. However, a larger German community was formed after 1871, when industrial workers from Saxony were displaced by economic competition from new industrial areas like the Ruhr. The German community was characterized by numerous school clubs, shooting clubs, national and regional clubs, as well as men's choirs and mutual aid societies, many of which were clustered around the Turn Verein, a major social club on Park Street.  Germans had a considerable number of churches in Lawrence, including Church of the Assumption of Mary (German Catholic) parish formed in 1887 on Lawrence Street, as well as a number of Protestant churches including The German Methodist Episcopal Church, Vine street, organized in 1878; and the German Presbyterian, East Haverhill street, organized 1872 from which the Methodist church split in 1878.

Italians
Some Italian immigrants celebrated Mass in the basement chapel of the largely Irish St. Laurence O'Toole Church, at the intersection of East Haverhill Street and Newbury Street, until they had collected sufficient funds to erect the Holy Rosary Church in 1909 nearby at the intersection of Union Street and Essex Street. Immigrants from Lentini (a comune in the Sicilian province of Syracuse) and from the Sicilian province of Catania maintained a particular devotion to three Catholic martyrs, Saint Alfio, Saint Filadelfo and Saint Cirino, and in 1923 began celebrating a procession on their feast day. Although most of the participants live in neighboring towns, the Feast of Three Saints festival continues in Lawrence today.  Many of the Italians who lived in the Newbury Street area had immigrated from Trecastagni, Viagrande, Acireale, and Nicolosi, Italy.

French Canadians
French Canadians were the second major immigrant group to settle in Lawrence. In 1872, they erected their first church, St. Anne's, at the corner of Haverhill and Franklin streets. Within decades, St. Anne's established a "missionary church", Sacred Heart on South Broadway, to serve the burgeoning Québécois community in South Lawrence. Later it would also establish the "missionary" parishes in Methuen: Our Lady of Mount Carmel and St. Theresa's (Notre-Dame du Mont Carmel et St-Thérèse). The French-Canadians arrived from various farming areas of Quebec where the old parishes were overpopulated: some people moved up north (Abitibi and Saguenay–Lac-Saint-Jean), while others moved to industrial towns to find work (Montreal, Quebec; but also in the United States). Others who integrated themselves into these French-Canadian communities were actually Acadians who had left the Canadian Maritimes of New Brunswick and Nova Scotia also in search of work.

Lebanese ("Syrians")
Lawrence residents frequently referred to their Arabic-speaking Middle Eastern community as "Syrian". In fact, most so-called Syrians in Lawrence were from present-day Lebanon and were largely Maronite Christian. Lebanese and Syrians mostly settled in the neighborhoods of North Lawrence such as Tower Hill along with Prospect Hill. Lebanese immigrants organized St. Anthony's Maronite Church in 1903 on the corner of Lebanon Street and Lawrence Street, and St. Joseph's Melkite Greek-Catholic Church, as well as St. George's Antiochian Orthodox Church.

Jews

Jewish merchants became increasingly numerous in Lawrence and specialized in dry goods and retail shops. The fanciest men's clothing store in Lawrence, Kap's, established in 1902 and closed in the early 1990s, was founded by Elias Kapelson, born in Lithuania. Jacob Sandler arrived Lawrence in June, 1891 (1906, his two brothers (Isaac and Sundel arrived), and 3 other brothers also arrived in early 1900's.  Jacob opened a shoe business at 434 Broadway, and earned enough income to purchase the property at 256–258 Essex St starting Sandler's Department Store, and it later became Sandler's Luggage which continued under his son, Simon Sandler and later his grandson, Robert Sandler until 1978. In the 1880s, the first Jewish arrivals established a community around Common, Valley, Concord and Lowell streets. As of 1922, there were at least two noteworthy congregations, both on Concord Street: Congregation of Sons of Israel (Jewish), organized October 3, 1894. Synagogue on Concord street, built in 1913; and Congregation of Anshea Sfard (Jewish), organized April 6, 1900. Synagogue on Concord street built in the autumn of 1907.  In the 1920s, the Jews of Lawrence began congregating further up Tower Hill, where they erected two synagogues on Lowell Street above Milton Street, as well as a Jewish Community Center on nearby Haverhill Street. All three institutions had closed their doors by 1990 as the remaining elderly members of the community died out or moved away.

Polish
The Polish community of Lawrence was estimated to be only 600–800 persons in 1900. However, by 1905, the community had expanded sufficiently to fund the construction of the Holy Trinity Church at the corner of Avon and Trinity streets. Their numbers grew to 2,100 Poles in 1910. Like many of their immigrant brethren from other nations, most of the Poles were employed in woolen and worsted goods manufacturing.

Lithuanians
Lawrence had a sizable enough Lithuanian community to warrant the formation of both Lithuanian Catholic and Lithuanian National Catholic churches. St. Francis (Lithuanian Catholic Church) on Bradford Street was formed in 1903 by Rev. James T. O'Reilly of St. Mary's, in a building previously occupied by St. John's Episcopal Church.  The church closed in 2002, merging with Holy Trinity (Polish) and SS. Peter and Paul (Portuguese). Sacred Heart Lithuanian National Catholic Church was established about 1917 and located on Garden Street until its closure and sale in 2001.

English
A sizable English community, composed mainly of unskilled laborers who arrived after 1880, sought work in the textile mills where they were given choice jobs by the Yankee overseers on account of their shared linguistic heritage and close cultural links.

Yankee farmers

Not all immigrants to Lawrence were foreign-born or their children. Yankee farmers, unable to compete against the cheaper farmlands of the Midwest that had been linked to the East coast by rail, settled in corners of Lawrence. Congregationalists were the second Protestant denomination to begin worship in Lawrence after the Episcopalians, with the formation of the Lawrence Street Congregational Church in 1847, and the first in South Lawrence, with the erection in 1852 of the first South Congregational Church on South Broadway, near the corner of Andover Street.  Baptist churches included The First Baptist Church, one of the first churches in Lawrence, which was organized in the spring of 1947 and was known as Amesbury Street Baptist Church.  Second Baptist was organized September 6, 1860; its building dedicated in 1874.

New immigrants, 1970 to present
Immigration of foreign-born workers to Lawrence largely ceased in 1921 with the passage of strict quotas against immigrants from the countries that had supplied the cheap, unskilled workers.

Although many quotas were lifted after the Second World War, foreign immigration to Lawrence only picked up again in the early 1960s with Hispanic immigrants from Cuba, Puerto Rico, the Dominican Republic and other Latin American countries. Immigrants from Southeast Asia, particularly Vietnam, have also settled in Lawrence.

Indicative of immigration trends, several Catholic churches now conduct masses in two or more languages. St. Patrick's Church, a Catholic church in Lawrence and once an Irish bastion, has celebrated Spanish masses on Sundays since 1999. A mass in Vietnamese is also offered every other week. St. Mary's of the Assumption Parish is the largest Catholic parish in Lawrence by Mass attendance and number of registered parishioners. It has the largest multi-lingual congregation in the city and has been offering Spanish masses since the early 1990s.

Since the 1990s, increasing numbers of former Catholic churches, closed since the 1980s when their Irish or Italian congregations died out, have been bought by Hispanic evangelical churches.

The 2000 Census revealed the following population breakdown, illustrating the shift toward newer immigrant groups:

Dominican Republic, 22%; other Hispanic or Latino, 12%; Irish, 7%; Italian, 7%, French (except Basque), 5%; Black or African American, 5%; French Canadian, 5%; English, 3%; Arab, 2%; German, 2%;  Lebanese, 2%; Central American, 1%; Polish, 1%; Portuguese, 1%; Guatemalan, 1%;  Vietnamese, 1%; South American, 1%; Spanish, 1%; Cambodian, 1%; Scottish, 1%; Cuban, 1%; Scotch-Irish, 1%; Ecuadoran, 1%.

Geography

On the north side of the river, it is surrounded by Methuen. On the south side of the river, the town is bordered by North Andover to the east, and Andover to the south and southwest.

Aside from the Merrimack River, other water features include the Spicket River, which flows into the Merrimack from Methuen, and the Shawsheen River, which forms the southeastern border of the city. Lawrence has two power canals that were formerly used to provide hydropower to the mills—one on the north bank of the river, the other on the south. Channeling water into these canals is the Great Stone Dam, which lies across the entire Merrimack and was, at the time of its construction in the 1840s, the largest dam in the world. Other prominent hills include Prospect Hill, in the northeast corner of the city, and Mount Vernon, along the southern edge of the city. Most industrial activity was concentrated in the flatlands along the rivers. Den Rock Park, a wooded conservation district on the southern edge of Lawrence that spans the Lawrence-Andover town line, provides recreation for nature lovers and rock-climbers alike. There are also several small parks throughout town.

Climate

Lawrence has a humid continental climate (Köppen climate classification Dfa), which is typical for the southern Merrimack valley region in eastern Massachusetts.

Demographics

As of the 2020 United States census, Lawrence had a population of 89,143. Of which, 81.7% were Hispanic/Latino, 12.3% were non-hispanic White, 2.3% were non-hispanic Black, 1.7% were Asian, 0.1% were Native American or Pacific Islander, 1.9% mixed or other.

According to the U.S. Census Bureau 2010 Census, the city's population is 76,377, the population density is 10,973.7 per square mile (4237/km2), and there are 27,137 households (25,181 occupied).

The racial makeup of the city in 2016 was 16.6% non-Hispanic white, 7.8% Black or African American, 2.8% Asian (1.2% Cambodian, 0.7% Vietnamese, 0.3% Pakistani, 0.2% Indian, 0.2% Chinese, 0.1% Korean), 0.4% American Indian or Alaskan Native, 0.0% Pacific Islander, 39.3% some other race, 2.7% two or more races, and 77.1% of the population is Hispanic or Latino (of any race) (47.0% Dominican, 21.7% Puerto Rican, 3.0% Guatemalan, 0.7% Salvadoran, 0.7% Spanish, 0.6% Cuban, 0.5% Ecuadorian, 0.5% Mexican, 0.2% Honduran, 0.2% Colombian, 0.1% Venezuelan, 0.1% Nicaraguan, 0.1% Peruvian).

As of the census of 2000, there were 72,043 people, 24,463 households, and 16,903 families residing in the city. The racial makeup of the city was 48.64% White (U.S. Average: 72.4%), 4.88% African American (U.S. Average: 12.3%), 2.65% Asian (U.S. Average: 3.6%), 0.81% Native American (U.S. Average: 0.1%), 0.10% Pacific Islander (U.S. Average: 0.1%), 36.67% from other races (U.S. Average: 5.5%), 6.25% from two or more races (U.S. Average: 2.4%).

There were 24,463 households where the average household size was 2.90 and the average family size was 3.46.
 41.4% had children under the age of 18 living with them. (U.S. Average: 32.8%)
 36.6% were married couples living together. (U.S. Average: 51.7%)
 25.7% had a female householder with no husband present. (U.S. Average: 12.2%)
 30.9% were non-families. (U.S. Average: 31.9%)
 25.5% of all households were made up of individuals. (U.S. Average: 25.8%)
 10.0% had someone living alone who was 65 years of age or older. (U.S. Average: 9.2%)

In the city, the population had a median age was 30.0 years (U.S. Average: 35.3):
 32.0% under the age of 18
 11.1% from 18 to 24
 30.3% from 25 to 44
 16.7% from 45 to 64
 9.8% were 65 years of age or older.

For every 100 females, there were 91.6 males. For every 100 females age 18 and over, there were 86.8 males.

The median income for a household in the city was $25,983 (U.S. Average: $41,994), and the median income for a family was $29,809 (U.S. Average: $50,046). Males had a median income of $27,772 versus $23,137 for females.  The per capita income for the city was $11,360. About 21.2% of families (U.S. Average: 9.2%) and 34.3% (U.S. Average: 12.4%) of the population were below the poverty line, including 31.7% of those under age 18 and 20.1% of those age 65 or over.

The former Mayor of Lawrence, Daniel Rivera, said the city was "approximately 75% Spanish" following an incident where non English speaking callers were allegedly hung up on by a 911 operator.

Economy
New Balance has a shoe manufacturing plant in Lawrence, one of five plants operating in the US.

Charm Sciences, which manufactures test kits and systems for antibiotic, veterinary drugs, mycotoxins, pesticides, alkaline phosphatase, pathogens, end-product microbial assessment, allergen control, and ATP hygiene, has a laboratory in Lawrence.

Arts and culture

Points of interest
 Bellevue Cemetery
 Campagnone Common
 Essex Art Center 
 Great Stone Dam
 High Service Water Tower and Reservoir
 Lawrence Community Works
 Lawrence Experiment Station
 Lawrence Heritage State Park
 Lawrence History Center
 Old Public Library
 Sacred Heart Parish Complex
 Saint Alfio Society (Feast of the Three Saints) - An Italian feast that is held every Labor Day weekend along Common Street
 Semana Hispana (Hispanic Week)
 Veterans Memorial Stadium

Library

The Lawrence Public Library was established in 1872. In fiscal year 2008, the city of Lawrence spent 0.55% ($1,155,597) of its budget on its public library—approximately $16 per person, per year ($19.60 adjusted for inflation in 2021).

Government 
Lawrence is one of Essex County's two county seats, along with Salem. As such, it is home to a juvenile, district and superior court, as well as a regional office of the Massachusetts Registry of Motor Vehicles.

Local

Lawrence has a "strong mayor", which is one directly elected by the voters to be the city's executive.  The city council are elected partly at large and partly from districts or wards of the city.  Party primaries are prohibited.  Lawrence has an established City Charter and a mayor-council government. There are nine city councilors and six school committee members; most are elected by district; three city council members are elected at large. There are six districts in Lawrence and all elections are non-partisan. The Mayor serves as the seventh member and chair of the school committee. The city council chooses one of its number as president who serves as chair of the council. The city of Lawrence also elects three members to the Greater Lawrence Technical School Committee these members are elected at-large. City Council and Mayoral terms of office begin in the month of January.

The current mayor is Brian A. De Peña.  The current members of the City Council are:

 Kendrys Vasquez, city council president (District C)
 Marc LaPlante, vice president (District F)
 Pavel Payano, councilor at large
 Celina Reyes, councilor at large
 Ana Levy, councilor at large
 Maria De La Cruz, District A
 Estela Reyes, District B
 Jeovanny A. Rodriguez, District D
 David C. Abdoo, District E

State government
Marcos Devers, (D-16th Essex district)
Christina Minicucci, (D-14th Essex district)
Frank A. Moran, (D-17th Essex district)
Barry Finegold, (D-2nd Essex and Middlesex district)
Eileen Duff (D), Governor's Councilor

Federal government
Lori Trahan, (D-United States House of Representatives, Massachusetts District 3)
Elizabeth Warren (D), Ed Markey (D), United States Senate

Education

Public schools

The city has a public school system managed by Lawrence Public Schools. In November 2011, the Lawrence Public Schools was placed into state receivership by the Massachusetts Board of Elementary & Secondary Education.

High schools
 Lawrence High School
 High School Learning Center
 Greater Lawrence Technical School – a regional technical high school serving the four communities of Andover, Lawrence, Methuen and North Andover

Charter schools
 Lawrence Family Development Charter School
 Community Day Charter Public School

Private schools

Elementary schools
 Bellesini Academy
 Esperanza Academy
  Lawrence Catholic Academy

High schools
 Central Catholic High School
 Notre Dame Cristo Rey High School

Higher education

Public
 Northern Essex Community College

Private
 Cambridge College

Media
Lawrence's main newspaper is The Eagle-Tribune, one of the major newspapers for the Merrimack Valley that was founded in Lawrence in 1890 but later moved its facilities to the town of North Andover on Route 114. Lawrence is home to Rumbo (a bilingual English/Spanish paper) and Siglo 21 (a Spanish paper). Another newspaper closely covering Lawrence news is The Valley Patriot, a monthly paper published in North Andover. The city has three AM stations, WNNW/800, WCAP/980, and WLLH/1400 (which is also dually licensed to Lowell, Massachusetts with a synchronous transmitter in that city); along with one FM station: WEEI-FM/93.7. WMFP is the only television station operating out of the city, and the city is considered part of the Boston television market.

Infrastructure

Transportation
Lawrence lies along Interstate 495, which passes through the eastern portion of the city. There are three exits entirely within the city, though two more provide access from just outside the city limits. The town is also served by Route 28 passing from south to north through the city, and Route 110, which passes from east to west through the northern half of the city. Route 114 also has its western terminus at Route 28 at the Merrimack River. Lawrence is the site of four road crossings and a railroad crossing over the Merrimack, including the O'Leary Bridge (Route 28), a railroad bridge, the Casey Bridge (bringing Parker Street and access to Route 114 and the Lawrence MBTA station to the north shore), the Duck Bridge (which brings Union Street across the river), and the double-decked O'Reilly Bridge, bringing I-495 across the river.

Lawrence is the western hub of the Merrimack Valley Regional Transit Authority's bus service. It is also home to the Senator Patricia McGovern Transportation Center, home to regional bus service and the Lawrence stop along the Haverhill/Reading Line of the MBTA Commuter Rail system, providing service from Haverhill to Boston's North Station. Amtrak's Downeaster service to Maine is available eight miles to the northeast in Haverhill. Lawrence Municipal Airport provides small plane service, though it is actually in neighboring North Andover. Lawrence is approximately equidistant from Manchester-Boston Regional Airport and Logan International Airport. Future plans to revitalize the Manchester and Lawrence branch to the north, leading to Manchester, New Hampshire, will allow the MBTA to operate rail service up to Manchester from Lawrence, in conjunction with Pan Am Freights.

Healthcare
Lawrence General Hospital, founded in 1875, is the city's main hospital, providing service to much of the area south of the city. Other nearby hospitals are in Methuen, Haverhill and Lowell. The city also is served by the Greater Lawrence Family Health Center.
Guardian Ambulance was established in 1990 and incorporated in 1991 by local EMTs to serve the city during a downturn in the economy at that time. The station moved from the Tower Hill section to its current location on Marston Street in 1993.

Public safety
Lawrence has its own police and fire departments, and Lawrence General Hospital provides ambulance services to the city.  The city is also covered by the Andover barracks of Troop A of the Massachusetts State Police, which serves much of the western Merrimack Valley and several towns just south of Andover.

Lawrence Correctional Alternative Center is a regional alternative jail for low-risk offenders.

Utilities
The city also has its own public works and trash pickup departments.

Notable people

See also
 1912 Lawrence textile strike
 American Automobile and Power Company
 American Woolen Company
 Bread and Roses
 Malden Mills
 Noack Organ Company
 Pemberton Mill
 List of mill towns in Massachusetts

References

Bibliography

 
 
 
 
 
 
 
 
 
 
 
 Maurice B. Dorgan, History of Lawrence, Massachusetts: With War Records. Lawrence, MA: Maurice B. Dorgan, 1924.
 "Ethnic tensions in Lawrence" (Archive). WGBH-TV. March 28, 1991.
 
 Urban redevelopment of Lawrence, MA a retrospective case study of the Plains Neighborhood by Pernice, Nicolas M., M.S. 2011.
 Barber, Llana. Latino City: Immigration and Urban Crisis in Lawrence, Massachusetts, 1945–2000 (U of North Carolina Press, 2017), xiv, 325 pp.

External links

 City of Lawrence official website
 Photos from Library of Congress at flickr.com
 Wall & Gray. 1871 Atlas of Massachusetts. Map of Massachusetts. USA. New England. Counties – Berkshire, Franklin, Hampshire and Hampden, Worcester, Middlesex, Essex and Norfolk, Boston – Suffolk,Plymouth, Bristol, Barnstable and Dukes (Cape Cod). Cities – Springfield, Worcester, Lowell, Lawrence, Haverhill, Newburyport, Salem, Lynn, Taunton, Fall River.   New Bedford. These 1871 maps of the Counties and Cities are useful to see the roads and rail lines.
 Beers, D.G. 1872 Atlas of Essex County Map of Massachusetts Plate 5.  Click on the map for a very large image.   Also see detailed map of 1872 Essex County Plate 7.
 
 Digital Commonwealth. Materials related to Lawrence, Mass., various dates.
 Library of Congress. Images related to Lawrence, Mass., various dates.

 
1655 establishments in Massachusetts
1984 riots
Cities in Essex County, Massachusetts
Cities in Massachusetts
County seats in Massachusetts
Hispanic and Latino American culture in Massachusetts
History of the textile industry
Industrial Revolution
Labor disputes in the United States
Little Italys in the United States
Massachusetts populated places on the Merrimack River
Populated places established in 1655